Xanthos Hadjisoteriou (1920-2003) was an acclaimed Greek Cypriot painter and interior designer. Born in Famagusta in 1920 and studied business at University of Beirut (1938–1940). Later studied art at the Central School of Arts and Crafts in London (1951–1953) and interior design at the Byam Shaw School of Art (1959).

Xanthos Hadjisoteriou held many exhibitions in Cyprus and internationally. In Famagusta he presented his works permanently at the "Manastiri" and later at Peter's Gallery in Limassol, where he settled. He won many awards for his art internationally.

The artist died at the age of 83 in 2003.

References

1920 births
2003 deaths
People from Famagusta
Greek Cypriot artists
Expatriates in Lebanon
Cypriot expatriates in the United Kingdom
Cypriot painters
Alumni of the Byam Shaw School of Art
Alumni of the Central School of Art and Design
20th-century Cypriot painters
20th-century Cypriot male artists